Prospect Hill Reservoir, also known as Prospect water tower or water tower hill, is a heritage-listed water tower situated in the western suburbs of Sydney, New South Wales, Australia. Built in 1934, the tower is one of the few concrete elevated reservoirs in Sydney, which features Egyptian-style doorways and serves the proximate suburban communities.

History

A reservoir was built in 1915 near its site, but was then deconstructed in 1936. In 1957, another tower was built just right next to it, which is darker grey in colour and slightly taller. In the 1960s/1970s, a roof was installed on the water tower to support higher water quality. It was listed on August 2000 in the New South Wales Heritage Database.

Design
The tower is physically similar to Dural Reservoir (1938) and Berowra Reservoir (1939), all have stepped or tapered sides and doorways at the bottom and top with Egyptian inspired door-frames. The platform above of tower for the staircase, which leads to the top of the reservoir, has a steel frame. Features of the tower include davit, handrails and inlet and outlet valve chambers. The tower is supplied by pumping water from the main Prospect Reservoir.

Geography
The tower is situated within the Prospect Nature Reserve in Reservoir Road, just east of Prospect Reservoir, although it is inaccessible for the public. Surrounded by Australian bushland, it is one of the highest points of Prospect Hill and can be observed from Prospect Highway and other areas nearby, due to its steep, prominently elevated, edged location.

References

Attribution 

Reservoirs in Sydney
1934 establishments in Australia
Buildings and structures in Sydney
Water towers in Australia
New South Wales State Heritage Register
Round buildings in Australia
Towers completed in 1934
Egyptian Revival architecture
Sydney Water